Christopher Sua'mene (born 16 August 1972) is a Samoan athlete. He competed in the men's discus throw at the 1996 Summer Olympics. Sua'mene's parents are Mene Mene, a duathlete, and Sally Mene, a javelin and discus thrower.

References

External links
 

1972 births
Living people
Athletes (track and field) at the 1996 Summer Olympics
Samoan male discus throwers
Olympic athletes of Samoa
Place of birth missing (living people)